Lucy Quist, née Afriyie, (born  1974) is a Ghanaian-British business and technology executive. She is a managing director for Morgan Stanley

Early life and education 
Born in London to Ghanaian parents, Peter and Mary Afriyie, Lucy Quist spent her formative years in both Europe and Africa. She went to Wesley Girls' High School in Cape Coast and attended sixth-form college at the Presbyterian Boys' Senior High School. She went on to study at the University of East London, graduating with a first-class honours degree in Electrical and Electronic Engineering. She holds an MBA from INSEAD in France.

Career 
In her early working life, she was an Electrical and Electronic Engineer at Ford Motor Company, and attained her Chartered Engineer certification. She joined the Royal Bank of Scotland as a change manager before switching to the telecommunications industry in 2008 at Millicom International Cellular, working in business development, sales, distribution, and marketing. Lucy Quist was appointed Head of Strategy and  Planning at Vodafone's Ghanaian subsidiary. In addition, she oversaw the company's wholesale and enterprise businesses. She served as the CEO of Airtel Ghana. In her leadership role, she advocated for greater youth STEM participation in Ghana through her company's corporate social responsibility initiative. She founded Quist Blue Diamond. She also co-founded FreshPay payment platform in the Democratic Republic of Congo and the Executive Women Network. In September 2018, she was appointed by FIFA as their Vice President of the Normalization Committee to restructure football in Ghana. She is currently a Managing Director at Morgan Stanley in its London office. She has also been engaged on the public speaking circuit at events such as the Mobile World Congress, Hogan Lovells African Forum 2017, Pan African Women Forum, TEDxEuston, Wharton Africa Business Forum, the Sanford C. Bernstein Center for Leadership and Ethics Conference at Columbia Business School and the African Development Investment Convention.

Boards and directorships 
Quist serves on several international and local boards of organisations including the:

 International Board for African Institute for Mathematical Sciences (AIMS)
 Chair, Petra (Pension) Trust Company Ltd.
 Obaatan Pa Women's Hospital
 Business Environment Enabling Programme under the UK Department of International Development (DFID)
 Business Sounding Board for the Danish Embassy in Accra
 Industry Advisory Board for Ashesi University 
 The Exploratory – An initiative of the African Women Advocacy Project
 Ghana Climate innovation centre 
 Women in Business Initiative
 Africa CEO Forum 
 Consolidated Bank of Ghana
 International Board of MercyShips
 Board of INSEAD

Works 

 The Bold New Normal: Creating The Africa Where Everyone Prospers (2019)

Awards and honours 

Quist has received the following awards:

 8th Most Influential Public Figures - Ghana Social Media Rankings (2016)
 Corporate Leadership Award, Ghana Legacy Honours (2017)
 Top 50 Women Corporate Leaders in Ghana (WomanRising)
 100 Most Influential Ghanaian Women, WomanRising
 CSR CEO of the Year, Ghana CSR Excellence Awards (2015)
 Telecom CEO of the Year, GITTA Awards (2016)
 Excellence in Corporate Responsibility, Ghana Women of the Year Honours (2016)
 58th Most Influential Person in Ghana, Ghana's Most Influential Awards (2016)
CIMG Marketing Woman of the Year, CIMG 2015 Awards (2014) 
 Special Recognition to the Telecom Industry, GTA (2015)
BBC's Power Women

References

External links
 
 

Living people
1974 births
English people of Ghanaian descent
Alumni of the University of East London
INSEAD alumni
Akan people
21st-century Ghanaian businesswomen
21st-century Ghanaian businesspeople
Ghanaian chief executives
People educated at Wesley Girls' Senior High School
Presbyterian Boys' Senior High School alumni
Ghanaian women engineers